Oheneyere Gifty Anti (born January 23,1970) is a Ghanaian journalist and broadcaster. 
She is the host of the Standpoint  programme; which discusses issues affecting women on Ghana Television.

Personal life
Gifty is a native of Cape Coast in the Central Region but was born and bred in Tema, the Greater Accra Region of Ghana. Due to economic hardship, she hawked and engaged in carpentry works to earn a living.

Gifty is married to Nana Ansah Kwao IV, Chief of Akwamu Adumasa. Their Marriage ceremony happened at the Trinity Baptist Church on the 25th October, 2015. She gave birth to her first child on 11 August, 2017. Their daughter, Nyame Anuonyam, is such a pride of hers and expresses so much joy in having a miracle child, even at her age.

She had receive honours and a new title. The new title FBI was conferred on her after she was awarded a Fellowship of the Boardroom Institute, FBI, by the Accra Business school. She is called Oheneyere FBI Dr Gifty Anti [15].

Education 
Gifty Anti had her basic education at Tema community 8 "Number 1" Basic School. She then proceeded to Mfantsiman Girls Secondary School where she served as an entertainment prefect. Also, she is an alumnus of the Ghana Institute of Journalism of which she served as Women’s Commissioner.

Career 
Ms Anti began her media career as an intern at the Ghana News Agency, then moved on to the Ghanaian Times as an intern. She later worked as an intern at the Ghana Broadcasting Corporation (GBC), where she was also offered the option to do her national service.

Gifty landed her first job as a Floor Manager at GTV. She later became a TV presenter, coach, gender advocate and a feminist.  She is currently the Chief Executive Officer of GDA Concept and host of Stand Point, a talk show about women's issues. 

She worked at the Ghanaian Times [a Ghanaian owned newspaper] as she received mentorship from Liz Hayfron.

In 2019, she launched her book titled "A Bit Of Me", the book reached number one on Amazon after one week of publication

Awards 

 Tell It Moms Exemplary Resilience Feminist Honour 2019
National Malaria Advocate
Most Inspiring Woman In Media
Most influential women

Publications 

 A bit of me (2019)
 Fifty Nuggets (2020)
 The Best of You (2020)

References 

Living people
Ghanaian journalists
1970 births
People from Cape Coast
Ghanaian women journalists
Mfantsiman Girls' Secondary School alumni
Ghanaian broadcasters
Ghana Institute of Journalism alumni